Parliamentary elections were held in Czechoslovakia on 26 and 27 November 1971.  They were the first held after the Constitutional Act on the Czechoslovak Federation converted Czechoslovakia into a federal republic, comprising the Czech Socialist Republic and the Slovak Socialist Republic, as well as the first elections in Czechoslovakia held in the aftermath of the Prague Spring.

The National Front, dominated by the Communist Party of Czechoslovakia, put forward a single list of candidates for both houses of the Federal Assembly, the House of the People (the lower house) and the House of Nations (the upper house).  A single NF-approved candidate ran in each single member constituency. With a total of 350 seats in the two Houses, 245 were assigned to the Communist Party, 20 to the Czechoslovak Socialist Party, 16 to the Czechoslovak People's Party, four to the Party of Slovak Revival, four to the Freedom Party, and 61 to independents. Voter turnout was reported to be 99.45%.

Like the other elections of the Communist era, the result was a foregone conclusion. People were afraid not to vote, and when they did so, those who entered a voting booth to modify their ballot paper could expect to be persecuted by the state.

Results

House of the People

House of Nations

References

Czechoslovakia
Parliamentary
Elections in Communist Czechoslovakia
Single-candidate elections
Czechoslovakia